Sabinus Theodor William Halvor Seidelin (29 April 1819 – 29 October 1904) was a Danish businessman and landowner. He founded the company S. Seidelin.

Early life and education
Seidelin was born on 29 April 1819 in Skanderborg, the son of pharmacist David Seidelin (1784–1858) and Cecilie Ulrikke Sidelmann (1788–1866). His brother was the historian Paulus Seidelin.

In 1834, Seidelin became an apprentice under merchant Vitus Ingerslev (1801–77) in Aarhus; after completing his apprenticeship, he worked for the firm for a few more years. In 1840, he moved to Hamburg to continue his commercial training at Heuss & Menke. He was later sent back to Denmark by the German company to work as a travelling salesman.

Career
 
On 19 October 1843, Seidelin opened a shop in Holbæk. His business prospered and developed into a wholesaler. His shop was located at Ahlgade 41.

On 29 May 1856, it relocated to Copenhagen where Seidelin purchased Moses & Søn G. Melchior's property at Amagertorv 11. The company was initially based in a rear wing but continued to grow and soon occupied the whole building.

Landowner
He later also acquired the large  estate in Scania, Sweden.

Personal life and legacy
 
Seidelin was on 27 June 1845 married to Christiane Nicoline Nehammer (27 June 1826 – 4 June 1893), daughter of dyer Carl (Carolus) Borromæus Nehammer (1776–1854) and Sophie Frederikke Klein (1785–1834).

He maintained a close relationship to the town of Holbæk even after moving to Copenhagen, visiting the town for the annual "bird shootings". Ge was a driving force behind the construction of the new St. Nicolas' Church. personally donating 5,00 Danish rigsdaler for its construction as well as many of the furnishings and fittings. In 1874, he was appointed the town's first honorary citizen. In 1898, he donated a pavilion to the public park .

He is one of the men seen in Peder Severin Krøyer's monumental 1905 group portrait painting From Copenhagen Stock Exchange (Børsen). A 1904 portrait study of Seidelin by Krøyer is now owned by the Hirschsprung Collection. An 1881 portrait painting of Seidelin by Carl Block is now owned by the Museum of Copenhagen. Seidelin has also been depicted by I. W. Tegner on an 1891 portrait lithography based on a photograph.

Seidelin died on 29 October 1904 at Lönstorp in Scania and is buried in the Garrison Cemetery in Copenhagen.

See also
 Jacob Heinrich Moresco

References

Further reading
 Ewald, Jesper: S. Seidelin 1843–1943
 Wolstrup, Søren: Købmand Seidelin og alle de andr. Holbæk Museum (2018)

External links
 Sabinus Seidelin at geni.com

 S. Seidelin
 Den Seidelinske slægt
 Video

19th-century Danish businesspeople
20th-century Danish landowners
Danish businesspeople in fashion
Danish textile industry businesspeople
People from Skanderborg Municipality
People from Holbæk Municipality
Businesspeople from Copenhagen
Knights of the Order of the Dannebrog
Seidelin family
1819 births
1904 deaths